Westlake High School (also known as Westlake High, Westlake, or WHS) is a public high school in the Westlake neighborhood of Thousand Oaks, in Ventura County, California. Westlake High School serves grades 9–12 in the Conejo Valley Unified School District. Middle schools that feed into Westlake include Colina Middle School and Los Cerritos Middle School.

The first graduating class was the class of 1980. The first principal was William Albers. All students entering Westlake High School in 1979 signed a charter, which sits in the office today. Ron Lipari was the principal of WHS for 15 years. In 2015, Jason Branham was selected as the new principal.

Academics

Rankings
Newsweek has consistently ranked WHS as one of the top high schools in the United States. In 2015, Westlake High ranked as the 210th top high school in the United States and the 26th-best high school in the state of California according to Newsweek. In 2015, Westlake's average score on Advanced Placement exams was 3.65. In 2016, Westlake ranked as the 119th top high school in the United States and the 15th-best high school in the state of California.

It is one of four high schools in the Conejo Valley Unified School District, that consistently has significantly above-average AP and SAT scores, and 96% of graduating seniors go on to attend some type of college or further education.

Academic teams
Westlake High School is home to several organized competitive academic teams, including: VEX Robotics, Academic Decathlon, Mock Trial, Science Olympiad, FBLA, and HOSA. In 2016, Westlake High School won the Ventura County Academic Decathlon for the fifth year in a row.

Advanced anatomy
Westlake High offers a course called Advanced Anatomy. In the course, students work on a human cadaver. Nancy Bowman, a physiology teacher, started the program in 1990. As of 1994, the school was the only school in the United States to have a second-year program in advanced anatomy. Jordan Michaels, co-founder of Ringadoc, participated in the program. In 2015, Dr. Ira Byock spoke to the honors class about Death With Dignity laws.

Athletics
Westlake High School offers a wide variety of sports and activities, including football, basketball, cross-country, tennis, volleyball, cheerleading, water polo, soccer, wrestling, lacrosse, softball, swimming, and track and field. Many Westlake athletic teams compete in the Marmonte League of the CIF Southern Section, and are known as the Warriors.

Aquatics program
From 1995 to 1999, the WHS boys' swim team won five consecutive Marmonte League titles. In 2001, WHS opened an aquatics complex on its campus. As of 2014, WHS boys' swim team had won three straight Marmonte League titles. WHS grad Veronika Weiss, who played on the girls' water polo team, was killed in the Isla Vista shooting. In 2015, the school retired her number 11.

Baseball
Several Westlake players have gone on to play professional baseball, including Matt Franco, Kevin Howard, Mike Lieberthal, John Snyder Mike Nickeas, and Christian Yelich. Westlake has never won a CIF Southern Section title, but played in championship games in 1998 and 2001. In 2018 it was coached by Zack Thornton.

Football

Westlake won the CIF Southern Section championships in 1999, 2003, 2009, and 2011

Several professional football players have played at WHS, including Billy Miller, Gary Wellman, Rudy Carpenter, Mike Seidman, and Patrick Mekari.

Golf
Westlake has had successful golf teams. In 2002, Senior Brian Van Heel won the CIF/CGA California State High School Championship. In 2014, the Westlake High School boys golf team won the CIF/CGA California State High School Championship. In 2015, the boys golf team again won the CIF/ CGA State Championship, becoming the first school to ever win back-to-back state titles in California.

Soccer
In the late 1980s, Eric Wynalda and Cobi Jones played on the boys' soccer team. In the 1986–87 season, Jones and Wynalda helped the team post a 22-2-2 record and led them to the semifinals of the Southern Section 4-A Division playoffs.

The Arts

The Carpenter Family Theatre
In 2010, Westlake High School's theatre, built in the 1970s, was expanded and renovated, and its name was changed to The Carpenter Family Theatre. It is named after The Carpenters, who initially approached the school about expanding and renovating the theatre, and donated an initial contribution to jumpstart construction.

Filming site
 Blink 182's music video for "Josie" (1998) was filmed at Westlake High School, using official Westlake High School uniforms.
 The 1994 movie A Friend to Die For was filmed at Westlake High School, using official Westlake High School cheer uniforms with the logo removed.
 The 2006 movie Gridiron Gang was filmed at Westlake High School.
 Halsey's music video for "Colors" (2016) was filmed at Westlake High School, using the football field, classroom, and quad.

Notable alumni

 Anthony Angelini (born 1994), entrepreneur, event producer, and humanitarian
 Deidre Behar, entertainment reporter 
 Danny Barrera, professional soccer player
 Aaron Bruno, singer for AWOLNATION
 Rudy Carpenter, NFL football player
 Jonni Cheatwood, artist
 Luke Christopher, singer, rapper
 Jason Cook, actor
 Matt Franco, retired Major League Baseball first baseman
 Helane Freeman, art director and artist
 Katherine Ho, former contestant on the Voice and featured vocalist in Crazy Rich Asians soundtrack.
 Kevin Howard, former professional baseball player 
 Nicole Johnson, model and beauty queen,  Miss California USA 2010
 Cobi Jones, retired professional soccer player; National Soccer Hall of Fame
 Danielle Kang, golfer, winner of 2017 Women's PGA Championship
 David Kaye, United Nations special rapporteur and clinical professor of law at University of California, Irvine
 Sam Kazemian, president & co-founder of Everipedia
 P.J. Lane, actor
 Mike Lieberthal (born 1972), retired Major League Baseball 2x All Star catcher
 Adam Mazarei, assistant basketball coach at Vanderbilt; former Memphis Grizzlies assistant coach, Redlands Maroon Squad
 Jordan Michaels, healthcare entrepreneur 
 Patrick Mekari, NFL football player
 Billy Miller, NFL football player
Trevor Moore, NHL hockey player
 Tahj Mowry, actor and former Westlake football running back
 Mike Nickeas, Major League Baseball catcher
 Catherine Ricafort, Broadway actress and singer
 Nick Rutherford, member of sketch group Good Neighbor and a Saturday Night Live writer
 Mike Seidman (born 1981), NFL football player
 Nelson Spruce, professional football player
 Gary Wellman, retired NFL football player
 Charlie Wi (born 1972), professional golfer
 Eric Wynalda, retired professional soccer player; National Soccer Hall of Fame
 Matthew Wolff, professional golfer
 Christian Yelich (born 1991), Major League Baseball player, 2018 National League MVP.

Notes

References

External links
Official site
Band website
Conejo Valley Unified School District
Choir Web Site
Westlake High School's Annual Soccer College Showcase

Conejo Valley Unified School District
High schools in Ventura County, California
Public high schools in California
Education in Thousand Oaks, California
Westlake Village, California
Educational institutions established in 1978
1978 establishments in California
Buildings and structures in Thousand Oaks, California